Ou Xiaotao (born 11 February 1980) is a Chinese freestyle skier. He competed at the 1998 Winter Olympics, the 2002 Winter Olympics, and the 2006 Winter Olympics.

References

1980 births
Living people
Chinese male freestyle skiers
Olympic freestyle skiers of China
Freestyle skiers at the 1998 Winter Olympics
Freestyle skiers at the 2002 Winter Olympics
Freestyle skiers at the 2006 Winter Olympics
People from Fushun
Asian Games medalists in freestyle skiing
Freestyle skiers at the 1996 Asian Winter Games
Asian Games gold medalists for China
Medalists at the 1996 Asian Winter Games